Trīna Šlapeka (born 20 May 1988 in Cēsis) is a retired Latvian tennis player.

Šlapeka never won a professional ITF tournament in her career, but, on 28 May 2007, reached her best singles ranking of world number 1400. On 23 April 2007, she peaked at world number 948 in the doubles rankings. She holds a win–loss record of 4–1 for Latvia in Fed Cup competition, having represented her country in 2007 and 2008 in Mauritius and Armenia respectively. Her latter appearances helped the team get promoted to Group II of the 2009 Fed Cup Europe/Africa Zone.

Šlapeka attended Lindsey Wilson College, in Kentucky, United States, where she gained an undergraduate degree. , she was studying for a master's degree in business at the Holy Names University in Oakland, California.

Fed Cup participation

Singles

Doubles

References

External links 

 
 
 

1988 births
Living people
People from Cēsis
People from Jūrmala
Latvian female tennis players
Lindsey Wilson Blue Raiders women's tennis players
Holy Names University alumni